Andrew Martin Kamarck (died 3 March 2010) was an American economist, Director of the Economic Development Institute at the World Bank and Regents Professor at University of California, Los Angeles.

In 1936, Kamarck got his BA summa cum laude at Harvard University. In 1951, he got his Ph.D at Harvard. He worked for the Federal Reserve Board and, during World War II, he "was posted to the Allied Control Commission for Italy, where he supervised the Banca d'Italia". In 1944, he "was assigned as Chief of the U.S. Financial Intelligence in Germany".

He then continued to work for the United States Secretary of the Treasury in 1946, contributing to the "policy guidelines for the Marshall Plan." He later became World Bank Economic Adviser, Professor at University of California, Los Angeles (1964–65) "and Research Associate at the Harvard Center of International Affairs.

Publications
The African Economy and International Trade. Paper. In: The United States and Africa. Thirteenth American Assembly, Columbia University, Harriman, New York, May 1–4, 1958  
Economic evolution of Africa. Industrial College of the Armed Forces, 1960. 
Recent economic growth in Africa. American Academy of Political and Social Science, 1964. 
The Economics of African Development. New York: Praeger, 1967
Reviewed by Robert P. Armstrong. In: The American Economic Review, vol. 57, no. 5, 1967, p. 1339-1342.
The Appraisal of Country Economic Performance. In: Economic Development and Cultural Change, vol. 18, no. 2, p. 153-165, 1970.
Capital and Investment in Developing Countries. In: Finance and Development, vol. 8, p. 2, 1971.
The Economics of African Development. Praeger, 1971. 
Climate and economic development. Economic Development Institute, 1972
Climate and economic development. Seminar paper. Economic Development Institute, International Bank for Reconstruction and Development, 1975. 
The Tropics and Economic Development: A Provocative Inquiry into the Poverty of Nations. Baltimore/London: The Johns Hopkins University Press, 1976. (for the World Bank) 
Reviewed by William Diebold Jr., Foreign Affairs, April 1977.
Reviewed by Mark Perlman. In: Journal of Economic Literature, vol. 16, no. 1, 1978, p. 120-123.
The Tropics and Economic Development. The Johns Hopkins University Press, 1979. 
With William D. Clark. McNamara's Bank. In: Foreign Affairs, vol. 60, no. 4, 1982, p. 951-953.
The Resources of Tropical Africa. In: Daedalus, vol. 111, no. 2 (Black Africa: A Generation after Independence.), 1982, p. 149-163.
Economics and the Real World. Philadelphia: University of Pennsylvania Press, 1983. 
Reviewed by E. Scott Maynes. In: Journal of Economic Literature, vol. 23, no. 4, 1985, p. 1786-1788.
Reviewed by Paul Streeten. In: Economic Development and Cultural Change, vol. 34, no. 1, 1985, p. 173-176.
Slow Growth in Africa. In: The Journal of Economic Perspectives, vol. 14, no. 2, 2000, p. 235-237.
Economics for the Twenty-First Century: The Economics of the Economist-Fox. Ashgate Publishing, 2001. 
Economics as a Social Science: An Approach to Nonautistic Theory. University of Michigan Press, 2002. 
Economics as a Social Science: An Approach to Nonautistic Theory. Book description at The University of Michigan Press.
Reviewed by Esther-Mirjam Sent. In: The Review of Politics, 66, p. 350-352, 2004. 
The Debt Crisis in Africa. In: Journal of Economic Issues, v 28, n. 4, p. 1294(4)

Further reading
Rati Ram. Tropics and economic development: An empirical investigation. In: World Development, vol. 25, Issue 9, September 1997, p. 1443-1452.

See also
Geography and wealth

References

External links
Remembrance for Andrew Kamarck, World Bank

Economic geographers
Harvard University alumni
Johns Hopkins University faculty
University of California, Los Angeles faculty
United States Department of the Treasury officials
2010 deaths
1914 births